Markus Piispanen (born May 29, 1989) is a Finnish professional ice hockey winger currently playing for Virkiä of the 2. Divisioona.

Piispanen played 12 games for Kärpät during the 2015–16 Liiga season and scored one assist. He also played in Mestis for Sport, Hokki and Espoo United.

He is the younger brother of Arsi Piispanen who was drafted by the Columbus Blue Jackets in 2003 and currently plays for IK Oskarshamn of the Swedish Hockey League.

References

External links

1989 births
Living people
HDD Jesenice players
Brest Albatros Hockey players
Clarkson Golden Knights men's ice hockey players
Espoo United players
Finnish ice hockey forwards
Hokki players
Nybro Vikings players
Oulun Kärpät players
Sportspeople from Jyväskylä
Vaasan Sport players
21st-century Finnish people
Lapuan Virkiä players
Finnish expatriate ice hockey players in the United States
Finnish expatriate ice hockey players in Slovenia
Finnish expatriate ice hockey players in Sweden
Finnish expatriate ice hockey players in France